Privacy Commissioner may refer to:
 Privacy Commissioner of Canada
 Privacy Commissioner (New Zealand)